Kosala was one of the 16 Mahajanapadas in the 6th to 5th centuries BCE, approximately present Awadh (Oudh) in Uttar Pradesh.

Kosala may also refer to:
 Kosala Kingdom
 Kosala (moth), a genus of moth
 Kosala (novel), a 1963 Marathi novel by Bhalchandra Nemade

People with the given name
Kosala Devi, first wife of Magadha Emperor Bimbisara (558–491 BCE) 
Kosala Kulasekara (born 1985), Sri Lankan cricketer
Kosala Kuruppuarachchi (born 1964), Sri Lankan cricketer
Kosala Ramadas (died 2013), politician in Kerala, India

See also
 Dakshina Kosala Kingdom or South Kosala, in present Chhattisgarh state and western Odisha state 
 Kosal (disambiguation)